William Henry Barber (23 July 1906 – 14 January 1981) was an English cricketer active from 1927 to 1933 who played for Warwickshire. He was born in Nuneaton and died in Coventry. He appeared in five first-class matches as a righthanded batsman who bowled right arm fast-medium pace. He scored 71 runs with a highest score of 23. He took seven wickets with a best analysis of three for 81.

Notes

1906 births
1981 deaths
English cricketers
Warwickshire cricketers
Cheshire cricketers
Sportspeople from Nuneaton